Hruška is a Czech-language surname.

Hruška may also refer to:
 18841 Hruška
 Hruška (Prostějov District), a village in the Olomouc Region of the Czech Republic

See also 
 Hrušky (disambiguation)